John Gamble Geddes, D.C.L. (March 29, 1811; November 16, 1891) was a Canadian Anglican priest in the 19th century.

Geddes was educated at King's College, Toronto. Ordained in 1835,  his first post was at St George, Kingston, ON. After a spell at Three Rivers he held incumbencies in Hamilton, Ontario and Tatsfield, Kent, England. He was Dean of Niagara from 1875 until his death in 1891.

References

University of Toronto alumni
Deans of Niagara
19th-century Canadian Anglican priests
1811 births
1891 deaths